Icône  is a skyscraper complex in Montreal, Quebec, Canada designed by the architecture firm Béïque Legault Thuot. The towers are located on René-Lévesque Boulevard at the corner of De la Montagne Street, near the Bell Centre and facing the Roccabella development.

The promoter of the project is Metropolitan Parking Inc.

The West Tower consists of 358 luxury condos. The East Tower, meanwhile, has mixed-use, containing office space and rental apartment units.

References

External links

Official website - Icone

Residential skyscrapers in Canada
Skyscrapers in Montreal
Skyscraper office buildings in Canada